The GNU C Library, commonly known as glibc, is the GNU Project's implementation of the C standard library. Despite its name, it now also directly supports C++ (and, indirectly, other programming languages). It was started in the 1980s by the Free Software Foundation (FSF) for the GNU operating system.

Released under the GNU Lesser General Public License, glibc is free software. The GNU C Library project provides the core libraries for the GNU system, as well as many systems that use Linux as the kernel. These libraries provide critical APIs including ISO C11, POSIX.1-2008, BSD, OS-specific APIs and more. These APIs include such foundational facilities as open, read, write, malloc, printf, getaddrinfo, dlopen, pthread_create, crypt, login, exit and more.

History
The glibc project was initially written mostly by Roland McGrath, working for the Free Software Foundation (FSF) in the summer of 1987 as a teenager. In February 1988, FSF described glibc as having nearly completed the functionality required by ANSI C. By 1992, it had the ANSI C-1989 and POSIX.1-1990 functions implemented and work was under way on POSIX.2. In September 1995 Ulrich Drepper made his first contribution to the glibc and by 1997 most commits were made by him. Drepper held the maintainership position for many years and until 2012 accumulated 63% of all commits to the project.

In May 2009 glibc was migrated to a Git repository.

In 2010, a licensing issue was resolved which was caused by the Sun RPC implementation in glibc that was not GPL compatible. It was fixed by re-licensing the Sun RPC components under the BSD license.

In 2014, glibc suffered from an ABI breakage bug on s390.

In July 2017, 30 years after he started glibc, Roland McGrath announced his departure, "declaring myself maintainer emeritus and withdrawing from direct involvement in the project. These past several months, if not the last few years, have proven that you don't need me anymore".

In 2018, maintainer Raymond Nicholson removed a joke about abortion from the glibc source code. It was restored later by Alexandre Oliva after Richard Stallman demanded to have it returned.

In 2021, the copyright assignment requirement to the Free Software Foundation was removed from the project.

Version history 
For most systems, the version of glibc can be obtained by executing the lib file (for example, /lib/libc.so.6).

Fork and variant 
In 1994, the developers of the Linux kernel forked glibc. Their fork, "Linux libc", was maintained separately until around 1998. Because the copyright attribution was insufficient, changes could not be merged back to the GNU Libc. When the FSF released glibc 2.0 in January 1997, the kernel developers discontinued Linux libc due to glibc 2.0's superior compliance with POSIX standards. glibc 2.0 also had better internationalisation and more in-depth translation, IPv6 capability, 64-bit data access, facilities for multithreaded applications, future version compatibility, and the code was more portable. The last-used version of Linux libc used the internal name (soname) . Following on from this, glibc 2.x on Linux uses the soname 

In 2009, Debian and a number of derivatives switched from glibc to the variant eglibc. Eglibc was supported by a consortium consisting of Freescale, MIPS, MontaVista and Wind River. It contained changes that made it more suitable for embedded usage and had added support for architectures that were not supported by glibc, such as the PowerPC e500. The code of eglibc was merged back into glibc at version 2.20. Since 2014, eglibc is discontinued. The Yocto Project and Debian also moved back to glibc since the release of Debian Jessie.

Steering committee
Starting in 2001 the library's development had been overseen by a committee, with Ulrich Drepper kept as the lead contributor and maintainer. The steering committee installation was surrounded by a public controversy, as it was openly described by Ulrich Drepper as a failed hostile takeover maneuver by Richard Stallman.

In March 2012, the steering committee voted to disband itself and remove Drepper in favor of a community-driven development process, with Ryan Arnold, Maxim Kuvyrkov, Joseph Myers, Carlos O'Donell, and Alexandre Oliva holding the responsibility of GNU maintainership (but no extra decision-making power).

Functionality
glibc provides the functionality required by the Single UNIX Specification, POSIX (1c, 1d, and 1j) and some of the functionality required by ISO C11, ISO C99, Berkeley Unix (BSD) interfaces, the System V Interface Definition (SVID) and the X/Open Portability Guide (XPG), Issue 4.2, with all extensions common to XSI (X/Open System Interface) compliant systems along with all X/Open UNIX extensions.

In addition, glibc also provides extensions that have been deemed useful or necessary while developing GNU.

Supported hardware and kernels
glibc is used in systems that run many different kernels and different hardware architectures. Its most common use is in systems using the Linux kernel on x86 hardware, however, officially supported hardware includes: 32-bit ARM and its newer 64-bit ISA (AArch64), ARC, C-SKY, DEC Alpha, IA-64, Motorola m68k, MicroBlaze, MIPS, Nios II, PA-RISC, PowerPC, RISC-V, s390, SPARC, and x86 (old versions support TILE). It officially supports the Hurd and Linux kernels. Additionally, there are heavily patched versions that run on the kernels of FreeBSD and NetBSD (from which Debian GNU/kFreeBSD and Debian GNU/NetBSD systems are built, respectively), as well as a forked-version of OpenSolaris. It is also used (in an edited form) and named  in BeOS and Haiku.

Use in small devices
glibc has been criticized as being "bloated" and slower than other libraries in the past, e.g. by Linus Torvalds and embedded Linux programmers. For this reason, several alternative C standard libraries have been created which emphasize a smaller footprint. However, many small-device projects use GNU libc over the smaller alternatives because of its application support, standards compliance, and completeness. Examples include Openmoko and Familiar Linux for iPaq handhelds (when using the GPE display software).

Compatibility layers
There are compatibility layers ("shims") to allow programs written for other ecosystems to run on glibc interface offering systems. These include libhybris, a compatibility layer for Android's Bionic, and Wine, which can be seen as a compatibility layer from Windows APIs to glibc and other native APIs available on Unix-like systems.

See also

 Gnulib
 Linux kernel API

Notes

References

External links

 

C standard library
Cross-platform free software
Free computer libraries
Free software programmed in C
C Library
Interfaces of the Linux kernel
Linux APIs